Kaamos is the self-titled debut album by the Swedish death metal band Kaamos. It was released in 2002.

Track listing
  "Corpus Vermis"   – 4:10  
  "Circle of Mania"  – 3:57  
  "The Storms of Coming"  – 2:23  
  "Khem"  – 3:06  
  "Blood of Chaos"  – 5:56  
  "Doom of Man"  – 3:22  
  "The Chasm"  – 4:08  
  "Curse of Aeons"  – 3:39  
  "Cries of the Damned"  – 3:53

Kaamos (Swedish band) albums
2002 debut albums